Didarak may refer to:
 Didarak, Kerman
 Didarak, Yazd